Dan Goddard (born November 3, 1947) is an American politician who serves as 7th, since January 9, 2023. He previously served in the Kansas Senate for the 15th district from 2017 top 2021.

He was elected unopposed in District 7 in the 2022 Kansas House of Representatives election.

References

1947 births
Living people
Republican Party Kansas state senators
21st-century American politicians
People from Parsons, Kansas
Republican Party members of the Kansas House of Representatives